Saccella is a genus of bivalves belonging to the family Nuculanidae.

Species
 
 Saccella acapulcensis (Pilsbry & H. N. Lowe, 1932)
 † Saccella acinaciformis (Tate, 1886)
 Saccella acrita (Dall, 1908)
 † Saccella andrewi (Marwick, 1931) 
 Saccella approximans (Prashad, 1932)
 † Saccella arowhana (Marwick, 1931) 
 Saccella bathybia (Prashad, 1932)
 Saccella bellula (A. Adams, 1856)
 Saccella brookei (Hanley, 1860)
 Saccella caloundra (Iredale, 1929)
 Saccella cellulita (Dall, 1896)
 Saccella comita (Cotton & Godfrey, 1938)
 Saccella commutata (Philippi, 1844)
 Saccella confusa (Hanley, 1860)
 Saccella corbuloides (E. A. Smith, 1885)
 † Saccella costulata (Deshayes, 1858) 
 Saccella crassa (Hinds, 1843)
 Saccella cuneata (G. B. Sowerby I, 1833)
 Saccella cygnea (Thiele, 1931)
 Saccella darwini (E. A. Smith, 1884)
 Saccella discrepans (Prashad, 1932)
 † Saccella duplicarina (Laws, 1939) 
 Saccella eburnea (G. B. Sowerby I, 1833)
 Saccella electilis (Hedley, 1915)
 Saccella elenensis (G. B. Sowerby I, 1833)
 † Saccella expansa (Staadt, 1913) 
 † Saccella falcigera Marwick, 1965 
 Saccella fastigata (Keen, 1958)
 † Saccella galeottiana (Nyst, 1845) 
 Saccella gordonis (Yokoyama, 1920)
 Saccella hedleyi (Fleming, 1951)
 Saccella hindsii (Hanley, 1860)
 Saccella illirica (Carrozza, 1987)
 Saccella impar (Pilsbry & H. N. Lowe, 1932)
 Saccella irradiata (G. B. Sowerby II, 1870)
 Saccella laeviradius (Pilsbry & H. N. Lowe, 1932)
 Saccella larranagai (Klappenbach & Scarabino, 1969)
 Saccella mauritiana (G. B. Sowerby I, 1833)
 Saccella maxwelli Beu, 2006
 Saccella micans (Hanley, 1860)
 † Saccella motutaraensis (Powell, 1935) 
 Saccella novaeguineensis (E. A. Smith, 1885)
 † Saccella onairoensis (Marwick, 1926) 
 † Saccella pahiensis (C. A. Fleming, 1950) 
 Saccella penderi (Dall & Bartsch, 1910)
 † Saccella probellula (Marwick, 1929) 
 † Saccella redunca (Dell, 1950) 
 Saccella robsoni (Prashad, 1932)
 † Saccella ruellensis (Glibert & van de Poel, 1965) 
 Saccella sematensis (Suzuki & Ishizuka, 1943)
 † Saccella semiteres (Hutton, 1877) 
 Saccella sibogai (Prashad, 1932)
 † Saccella striata (Lamarck, 1805) 
 Saccella takaoensis (Otsuka, 1936)
 Saccella taphria (Dall, 1897)
 Saccella tashiensis (T. C. Lan & Y.-C. Lee, 2001)
 † Saccella tenellula (Bartrum & Powell, 1928) 
 † Saccella tumidula (Cossmann, 1886) 
 Saccella ventricosa (Hinds, 1843)
 Saccella verconis (Tate, 1891)
 Saccella verrilliana (Dall, 1886)
 Saccella vitrea (d'Orbigny, 1853)
 Saccella vulgaris (A. P. Brown & Pilsbry, 1913)
 † Saccella waihiana (Powell, 1931) 
 † Saccella waikohuensis (Marwick, 1931) 
 Saccella watsoni (E. A. Smith, 1885)
 † Saccella webbi Marwick, 1965 

Synonyms
 Saccella acuta (Conrad, 1831): synonym of Nuculana acuta (Conrad, 1831)
 Saccella agapea (Dall, 1908): synonym of Jupiteria agapea (Dall, 1908)
 Saccella concentrica (Say, 1824): synonym of Nuculana concentrica (Say, 1824)
 Saccella dohrni (Hanley, 1861): synonym of Nuculana dohrni (Hanley, 1861)
 Saccella pontonia (Dall, 1890): synonym of Jupiteria pontonia (Dall, 1890)
 Saccella soyoae Habe, 1958: synonym of Nuculana husamaru Nomura, 1940

References

 Woodring W.P. (1925). Miocene Mollusca from Bowden Jamaica, pelecypods and scaphopods. Carnegie Institution of Washington Publication, 366 : 1-564, pl. 1-40.
 Coan, E. V.; Valentich-Scott, P. (2012). Bivalve seashells of tropical West America. Marine bivalve mollusks from Baja California to northern Peru. 2 vols, 1258 pp

External links
 Iredale, T. (1929). Mollusca from the continental shelf of eastern Australia. Records of the Australian Museum. 17(4): 157-189
 Marshall, B. A.; Spencer, H. G. (2013). Comments on some taxonomic changes affecting marine Bivalvia of the New Zealand region recently introduced in Huber's Compendium of bivalves, with some additional taxonomic changes. Molluscan Research. 33(1): 40-49
 La Perna R. (2008). Revision of the Nuculanidae (Bivalvia: Protobranchia) from the Cerulli Irelli collection (Mediterranean, Pleistocene). Bollettino della Società Paleontologica Italiana. 46(2-3): 125-137

Nuculanidae
Bivalve genera